Melbourne, the state capital of Victoria and second largest city in Australia, has a temperate oceanic climate (Köppen climate classification Cfb) and is well known for its changeable weather conditions. This is mainly due to Melbourne's geographical location. This temperature differential is most pronounced in the spring and summer months and can cause strong cold fronts to form. These cold fronts can be responsible for all sorts of severe weather from gales to severe thunderstorms and hail, minor temperature drops, and heavy rain. The city experiences little humidity in summer, except at the end of hot spells following thunderstorms and rain.

Overview
The shallow and enclosed Port Phillip Bay is often warmer than the surrounding landmass and the oceanic waters of the Bass Strait, particularly in spring and autumn; this can set up a "bay effect" similar to the lake effect seen in colder regions, where showers are intensified leeward of the bay. Relatively narrow streams of heavy showers can often affect the same places (usually in the southeastern suburbs) for an extended period, while the rest of Melbourne and surrounding suburbs stays dry. 

Overall, Melbourne is, owing to the rain shadowing by the Otway Ranges, nonetheless drier than average for southern Victoria. Despite its relative dryness, Melbourne has 139 days of rain per year on the 0.2mm threshold, meaning that its precipitation commonly falls as drizzles or as light showers (which frequently occur in the winter months), rather than heavy downpours (such as those generally experienced in Sydney, Brisbane and Perth).
 

The city receives only 48.6 clear days annually, making it the cloudiest capital city in Australia, and it has 180 overcast days annually, with 54 more cloudy days than Queenscliff to the south of the city, and 19 more than Mount Buller to the north. In comparison, Brisbane has 42 cloudy days annually, Sydney 134 and Hobart 174. According to the Bureau of Meteorology senior forecaster Terry Ryan, the excess cloud cover is caused by a meteorological phenomenon known as "anticyclonic gloom", where high-pressure systems in winter to the city's north and west conjure a layer of warm air at a high altitude, which holds moisture from Bass Strait. The cloudiest month in Melbourne is May, with an average of 18 cloudy days, followed by July, June and August, respectively.

Melbourne is also prone to isolated convective showers forming when a cold pool crosses the state, especially if there is considerable daytime heating. These showers are often heavy and can contain hails and squalls and significant drops in temperature, but they pass through very quickly at times with a rapid clearing trend to sunny and relatively calm weather and the temperature rising back to what it was before the shower. This often occurs in the space of minutes and can be repeated many times in a day, giving Melbourne a reputation for having "four seasons in one day", a phrase that is part of a local popular culture and familiar to many visitors to the city.

Recorded extremes (From Melbourne Regional Office):
Hottest temperature: , 7 February 2009
Coldest temperature: , 21 July 1869
Hottest Minimum: , 1 February 1902 
Coldest Maximum: , 4 July 1901
Wettest month: , February 1972
Wettest 24 hours: , 3 February 2005

Summer

Melbourne summers are notable for occasional days of extreme heat, which have increased in frequency since 2005. This occurs when the synoptic pattern is conducive to the transportation of very hot air from central Australia over to the south-east corner of the continent. The inland deserts of Australia are amongst the hottest areas on earth, particularly the inland parts of north-west Australia.

Every summer, intense heat builds starting in the Pilbara district of Western Australia around October/November and spreading widely over the tropical and subtropical inland parts of the continent by January. In the summer months, the southern part of the continent straddles the westerly wind belt to the south and the subtropical high-pressure ridge to the north. The intense heat buildup occurs where high pressure is highly dominant in the upper levels of the atmosphere over the tropics and subtropics of Australia in summer allowing for a huge area of stable atmospheric conditions to predominate.

On occasion, a strong cold front will develop in summer and bring the westerlies further north than their mean summer position. On these occasions, north-west winds will develop ahead of the cold front's passage and sometimes these can be very strong, even gale force. When this occurs the hot air from the inland is dragged right down over south-east Australia, occasionally even as far as southern Tasmania.

As this air mass is carried entirely over the continental land mass it remains unmodified, i.e. it does not pick up additional moisture from a body of water and retains most if not all of its heat. On these occasions, the normally temperate parts of southern Victoria, including Melbourne, can experience the full fury of the desert climate albeit only briefly as the cold front responsible usually passes through relatively quickly afterwards allowing cool southerly winds from the southern ocean to replace the hot desert air.

Winter
Winters in Melbourne are cool with moderate rainfall. On 25 July 1986, snow fell in the city, which caused air traffic delays of up to four hours.

Climate statistics

See also
 Extreme weather events in Melbourne

References

Melbourne
Melbourne